Book burning is the deliberate destruction by fire of books or other written materials, usually carried out in a public context. The burning of books represents an element of censorship and usually proceeds from a cultural, religious, or political opposition to the materials in question. Book burning can be an act of contempt for the book's contents or author, intended to draw wider public attention to this opinion, or conceal the information contained in the text from being made public, such as diaries or ledgers.

In some cases, the destroyed works are irreplaceable and their burning constitutes a severe loss to cultural heritage. Examples include the burning of books and burying of scholars under China's Qin Dynasty (213–210 BCE), the destruction of the House of Wisdom during the Mongol siege of Baghdad (1258), the destruction of Aztec codices by Itzcoatl (1430s), the burning of Maya codices on the order of bishop Diego de Landa (1562), and the burning of Jaffna Public Library in Sri Lanka (1981).

In other cases, such as the Nazi book burnings, copies of the destroyed books survive, but the instance of book burning becomes emblematic of a harsh and oppressive regime which is seeking to censor or silence some aspect of prevailing culture.

In modern times, other forms of media, such as phonograph records, video tapes, and CDs have also been burned, shredded, or crushed. Art destruction is related to book burning, both because it might have similar cultural, religious, or political connotations, and because in various historical cases, books and artworks were destroyed at the same time.

When the burning is widespread and systematic, destruction of books and media can become a significant component of cultural genocide.

Historical background

The burning of books has a long history as a tool that has been wielded by authorities both secular and religious, in their efforts to suppress dissenting or heretical views that are believed to pose a threat to the prevailing order.

Hebrew Bible (7th century BCE) 

According to the Tanakh (Hebrew holy text), in the 7th century BCE King Jehoiakim of Judah burned part of a scroll that Baruch ben Neriah had written at prophet Jeremiah's dictation (Jeremiah 36).

Burning of books and burying of scholars in China (210–213 BCE) 

In 213 BCE Qin Shi Huang, the first emperor of the Qin Dynasty, ordered the Burning of books and burying of scholars and in 210 BCE he supposedly ordered the live burial of 460 Confucian scholars in order to stay on his throne. Though the burning of books is well established, the live burial of scholars has been disputed by modern historians who doubt the details of the story, which first appeared more than a century later in the Han Dynasty official Sima Qian's Records of the Grand Historian. Some of these books were written in Shang Xiang, a superior school founded in 2208 BCE. The event caused the loss of many philosophical treatises of the Hundred Schools of Thought. Treatises which advocated the official philosophy of the government ("legalism") survived.

Christian book burnings (80–1759) 
In the New Testament's Acts of the Apostles, it is claimed that Paul performed an exorcism in Ephesus. After men in Ephesus failed to perform the same feat many gave up their "curious arts" and burned the books because apparently, they did not work.

And many that believed, came and confessed and shewed their deeds. Many of them also which used curious arts, brought their books together, and burned them before all men: and they counted the price of them, and found it fifty thousand pieces of silver.

After the First Council of Nicea (325 CE), Roman emperor Constantine the Great issued an edict against nontrinitarian Arians which included a prescription for systematic book-burning:  "In addition, if any writing composed by Arius should be found, it should be handed over to the flames, so that not only will the wickedness of his teaching be obliterated, but nothing will be left even to remind anyone of him. And I hereby make a public order, that if someone should be discovered to have hidden a writing composed by Arius, and not to have immediately brought it forward and destroyed it by fire, his penalty shall be death. As soon as he is discovered in this offense, he shall be submitted for capital punishment....." According to Elaine Pagels, "In AD 367, Athanasius, the zealous bishop of Alexandria... issued an Easter letter in which he demanded that Egyptian monks destroy all such unacceptable writings, except for those he specifically listed as 'acceptable' even 'canonical'—a list that constitutes the present 'New Testament'". (Pagels cites Athanasius's Paschal letter (letter 39) for 367 CE, which prescribes a canon, but her citation "cleanse the church from every defilement" (page 177) does not explicitly appear in the Festal letter.) Heretical texts do not turn up as palimpsests, scraped clean and overwritten, as do many texts of Classical antiquity.  According to author Rebecca Knuth, multitudes of early Christian texts have been as thoroughly "destroyed" as if they had been publicly burnt.

In 1759 Pope Clement XIII decreed that all books of biologist Linnaeus to be burned.

Burning of Nestorian books (435) 
Activity by Cyril of Alexandria ( 376–444) brought fire to almost all the writings of Nestorius (386–450) shortly after 435. 'The writings of Nestorius were originally very numerous', however, they were not part of the Nestorian or Oriental theological curriculum until the mid-sixth century, unlike those of his teacher Theodore of Mopsuestia, and those of Diodorus of Tarsus, even then they were not key texts, so relatively few survive intact, cf. Baum, Wilhelm and Dietmar W. Winkler. 2003. The Church of the East: A Concise History. London: Routledge.

Burning of Arian books (587) 

According to the Chronicle of Fredegar, Recared, King of the Visigoths (reigned 586–601) and first Catholic king of Spain, following his conversion to Catholicism in 587, ordered that all Arian books should be collected and burned; and all the books of Arian theology were reduced to ashes, along with the house in which they had been purposely collected. Which facts demonstrate that Constantine's edict on Arian works was not rigorously observed, as Arian writings or the theology based on them survived to be burned much later in Spain.

French burning of Jewish manuscripts in 1244 

In 1244, as an outcome of the Disputation of Paris, twenty-four carriage loads of Talmuds and other Jewish religious manuscripts were set on fire by French law officers in the streets of Paris.

Spanish empire burning of Aztec and Mayan manuscripts in the 1560s 

During the Spanish colonization of the Americas, numerous books written by indigenous peoples were burned by the Spaniards. Several books written by the Aztecs were burnt by Spanish conquistadors and priests during the Spanish conquest of Yucatán. Despite opposition from Catholic friar Bartolomé de las Casas, numerous books found by the Spanish in Yucatán were burnt on the order of Bishop Diego de Landa in 1562. De Landa wrote on the incident that "We found a large number of books in these characters and, as they contained nothing in which were not to be seen as superstition and lies of the devil, we burned them all, which they (the Maya) regretted to an amazing degree, and which caused them much affliction".

Catholic book burnings in Tudor and Stuart periods (16th–18th century)

The founding of the Church of England after King Henry VIII broke away from the Catholic Church led to the targeting of English Catholics by Protestants. During the Tudor and Stuart periods, Protestant citizens loyal to the Crown attacked Catholic religious sites across England, frequently burning any religious texts they found. These acts were encouraged by the Crown, who pressured the general public to take part in such "spectacles". According to American historian David Cressy, over "the course of the sixteenth and seventeenth centuries book burning developed from a rare to an occasional occurrence, relocated from an outdoor to an indoor procedure, and changed from a bureaucratic to a quasi-theatrical performance".

British burning of Washington during the War of 1812 

During the War of 1812, a British expeditionary force routed an American militia at Bladensburg. Shortly thereafter, the British marched into Washington, D.C., briefly capturing and occupying the city. In retaliation for the American destruction of Port Dover, the British ordered the destruction of several public buildings in the city, including the Library of Congress, erected just fourteen years prior. The U.S. Capitol was also burnt by the British, with books from the Library of Congress being used to burn the building. Both the library and the Capitol were rebuilt after the war.

Burning anti-slavery books in the American South, 1859–60 

Following John Brown's raid on Harpers Ferry in 1859, slaveholders and their supporters spread panic about abolitionism, believing that anti-slavery conspiracies would lead to widespread slave revolts. Pro-slavery southerners burned books in Mississippi, South Carolina, and Texas, including textbooks from public schools. Books that were critical of slavery, or insufficiently supportive of it, were seen as "anti-Southern" by the book-burners.

Comstock institution dedicated to book burnings in the USA (1873–1950)

Anthony Comstock's New York Society for the Suppression of Vice, founded in 1873, inscribed book burning on its seal, as a worthy goal to be achieved. Comstock's total accomplishment in a long and influential career is estimated to have been the destruction of some 15 tons of books, 284,000 pounds of plates for printing such "objectionable" books, and nearly 4,000,000 pictures. All of this material was defined as "lewd" by Comstock's very broad definition of the term – which he and his associates successfully lobbied the United States Congress to incorporate in the Comstock Law.

Nazi regime (1933) 

The Nazi government decreed broad grounds for burning material "which acts subversively on Nazi Germany's future or strikes at the root of German thought, the German home and the driving forces of German people".

Allied Powers in Japan after WW2 (1945–1952)

Under the occupation of Japan overseen by GHQ, any kind of criticism of the Allies was banned and many of books were prohibited and deleted. Over 7,000 books were destroyed.

Notable book burnings and destruction of libraries

Burnings by authors
In 1588, the exiled English Catholic William Cardinal Allen wrote "An Admonition to the Nobility and People of England", a work sharply attacking Queen Elizabeth I. It was to be published in Spanish-occupied England in the event of the Spanish Armada succeeding in its invasion. Upon the defeat of the Armada, Allen carefully consigned his publication to the fire, and it is only known of through one of Elizabeth's spies, who had stolen a copy.

Carlo Goldoni is known to have burned his first play, a tragedy called Amalasunta in the 1730s, when encountering unfavorable criticism.

The Hassidic Rabbi Nachman of Breslov is reported to have written a book which he himself burned in 1808. To this day, his followers mourn "The Burned Book" and seek in their Rabbi's surviving writings for clues as to what the lost volume contained and why it was destroyed.

Nikolai Gogol burned the second half of his 1842 magnum opus Dead Souls, having come under the influence of a priest who persuaded him that his work was sinful; Gogol later described this as a mistake.

As noted in Claire Tomalin's intensively researched "The Invisible Woman", Charles Dickens is known to have made a big bonfire of his letters and private papers, as well as asking friends and acquaintances to either return letters which he wrote to them or themselves destroy the letters – and most complied with his request in the 1850s and the 1860s. Dickens' purpose was to destroy evidence of his affair with the actress Nelly Ternan. To judge from surviving Dickens letters, the destroyed material – even if not intended for publication – might have had considerable literary merit.

Martin Gardner, a well-known expert on the work of Lewis Carroll, believes that Carroll had written an earlier version in the 1860s of Alice in Wonderland which he later destroyed after writing a more elaborate version which he presented to the child Alice who inspired the book.

In the 1870s Tchaikovsky destroyed the full manuscript of his first opera, The Voyevoda. Decades later, during the Soviet period, The Voyevoda was posthumously reconstructed from surviving orchestral and vocal parts and the composer's sketches.

20th century
Alberto Santos-Dumont, after being considered a spy by the French government in 1914 and then having this deception excused by the police, he destroyed all his aeronautical documents. The following year, according to the afterword to the historical novel "De gevleugelde," Arthur Japin says that when Dumont returned to Brazil, he "burned all his diaries, letters and drawings."

After Hector Hugh Munro (better known by the pen name Saki) was killed in World War I in November 1916, his sister Ethel destroyed most of his papers.

There is substantial evidence that Finnish composer Jean Sibelius worked on an Eighth Symphony. He promised the premiere of this symphony to Serge Koussevitzky in 1931 and 1932, and a London performance in 1933 under Basil Cameron was even advertised to the public. However, no such symphony was ever performed, and the only concrete evidence of the symphony's existence on paper is a 1933 bill for a fair copy of the first movement and short draft fragments first published and played in 2011. Sibelius had always been quite self-critical; he remarked to his close friends, "If I cannot write a better symphony than my Seventh, then it shall be my last." Since no manuscript survives, sources consider it likely that Sibelius destroyed most traces of the score, probably in 1945, during which year he certainly consigned a great many papers to the flames.

Aino, Sibelius' wife, recalled that "In the 1940s there was a great auto da fé at Ainola [where the Sibelius couple lived]. My husband collected a number of the manuscripts in a laundry basket and burned them on the open fire in the dining room. Parts of the Karelia Suite were destroyed – I later saw remains of the pages which had been torn out – and many other things. I did not have the strength to be present and left the room. I therefore do not know what he threw on to the fire. But after this my husband became calmer and gradually lighter in mood." It is assumed that a draft of Sibelius' Eighth Symphony - which he worked on in the early 1930s but with which he was not satisfied - was among the papers destroyed.

Joe Shuster, who together with Jerry Siegel created the fictional superhero Superman, in 1938 burned the first Superman story when under the impression that it would not find a publisher.

Axel Jensen made his debut as a novelist in Oslo in 1955 with the novel Dyretemmerens kors, but he later burned the remaining unsold copies of the book.

In August 1963, when C.S. Lewis resigned from Magdalene College, Cambridge and his rooms there were being cleaned out, Lewis gave instructions to Douglas Gresham to destroy all his unfinished or incomplete fragments of manuscript - which scholars researching Lewis' work regard as a grievous loss.

In 1976 detractors of Venezuelan liberal writer Carlos Rangel publicly burned copies of his book From the Noble Savage to the Noble Revolutionary in the year of its publication at the Central University of Venezuela.

Books saved from burning

In Catholic hagiography, Saint Vincent of Saragossa is mentioned as having been offered his life on condition that he consign Scripture to the fire; he refused and was martyred. He is often depicted holding the book which he protected with his life.

Another book-saving Catholic saint is the 10th-century Saint Wiborada. She is credited with having predicted in 925 an invasion by the then-pagan Hungarians of her region in Switzerland. Her warning allowed the priests and religious of St. Gall and St. Magnus to hide their books and wine and escape into caves in nearby hills. Wiborada herself refused to escape and was killed by the marauders, being later canonized. In art, she is commonly represented holding a book to signify the library she saved, and is considered a patron saint of libraries and librarians.

During a tour of Thuringia in 1525, Martin Luther became enraged at the widespread burning of libraries along with other buildings during the German Peasants' War, writing Against the Murderous, Thieving Hordes of Peasants in response.

During the Revolutions of 1848 in the Austrian Empire the Imperial Court Library (now Austrian National Library) was in extreme danger, when the bombardment of Vienna caused the burning of the Hofburg, in which the Imperial Library was located. Fortunately, the fire was halted in time - saving countless irreplaceable books, diligently collected by many generations of Habsburg emperors and the scholars in their employ.

At the beginning of the Battle of Monte Cassino in World War II, two German officers – Viennese-born Lt. Col. Julius Schlegel (a Roman Catholic) and Captain Maximilian Becker (a Protestant) – had the foresight to transfer the Monte Cassino archives to the Vatican. Otherwise the archives – containing a vast number of documents relating to the 1500-years' history of the Abbey as well as some 1,400 irreplaceable manuscript codices, chiefly patristic and historical – would have been destroyed in the Allied air bombing which almost completely destroyed the Abbey shortly afterwards. Also saved by the two officers' prompt action were the collections of the Keats-Shelley Memorial House in Rome, which had been sent to the Abbey for safety in December 1942.

The Sarajevo Haggadah – one of the oldest and most valuable Jewish illustrated manuscripts, with immense historical and cultural value – was hidden from the Nazis and their Ustaše collaborators by Derviš Korkut, chief librarian of the National Museum in Sarajevo. At risk to his own life, Korkut smuggled the Haggadah out of Sarajevo and gave it for safekeeping to a Muslim cleric in Zenica, where it was hidden until the end of the war under the floorboards of either a mosque or a Muslim home. The Haggadah again survived destruction during the wars which followed the breakup of Yugoslavia. 
 
In 1940s France, a group of anti-fascist exiles created a Library of Burned Books which housed all the books that Adolf Hitler had destroyed. This library contained copies of titles that were burned by the Nazis in their campaign to cleanse German culture of Jewish and foreign influences such as pacifist and decadent literature. The Nazis themselves planned to make a "museum" of Judaism once the Final Solution was complete to house certain books that they had saved.

Posthumous destruction of works 

When Virgil died, he left instructions that his manuscript of the Aeneid was to be burnt, as it was a draft version with uncorrected faults and not a final version for release. However, this instruction was ignored. It is mainly to the Aeneid, published in this "imperfect" form, that Virgil owes his lasting fame – and it is considered one of the great masterpieces of classical literature as a whole.

Before his death, Franz Kafka wrote to his friend and literary executor Max Brod: "Dearest Max, my last request: Everything I leave behind me... in the way of diaries, manuscripts, letters (my own and others'), sketches, and so on, [is] to be burned unread." Brod overrode Kafka's wishes, believing that Kafka had given these directions to him, specifically, because Kafka knew he would not honour them – Brod had told him as much. Had Brod carried out Kafka's instructions, virtually the whole of Kafka's work – except for a few short stories published in his lifetime – would have been lost forever. Most critics, at the time and up to the present, justify Brod's decision. In his forward to Kafka's The Castle Brod noted that when entering Kafka's apartment after his death, he found several big empty folders and traces of burnt paper - the manuscripts which were in these folders having evidently been destroyed by Kafka himself before his death. Brod expressed pain at the irreversible loss of this material and happiness at having saved so much of Kafka's work from its creator's ruthlessness.

A similar case concerns the noted American poet Emily Dickinson, who died in 1886 and left to her sister Lavinia the instruction of burning all her papers. Lavinia Dickinson did burn almost all of her sister's correspondences, but interpreted the will as not including the forty notebooks and loose sheets, all filled with almost 1800 poems; these Lavinia saved and began to publish the poems that year. Had Lavinia Dickinson been more strict in carrying out her sister's will, all but a small handful of Emily Dickinson's poetic work would have been lost.

In early 1964, several months after the death of C.S. Lewis, Lewis' literary executor Walter Hooper, rescued a 64-page manuscript from a bonfire of the author's writings – the burning carried out according to Lewis' will. In 1977, Hooper published it under the name The Dark Tower. It was apparently intended as part of Lewis' Space Trilogy. Though incomplete and evidently an early draft which Lewis abandoned, its publication aroused great interest and a continued discussion among Lewis fans and scholars researching his work.

Modern biblioclasm
Although the act of destroying books is condemned by the majority of the world's societies, book burning still occurs on a small or large scale.

20th century
In Azerbaijan, when a modified Latin alphabet was adopted, books which were published in the Arabic script were burned, especially those published in the late 1920s and 1930s. The texts were not limited to the Quran; medical and historical manuscripts were also destroyed.

Book burnings were regularly organised in Nazi Germany in the 1930s by stormtroopers so that "degenerate" works could be destroyed, especially works written by Jewish authors such as Thomas Mann, Marcel Proust, and Karl Marx. One of the most infamous book burnings in the 20th century occurred in Frankfurt, Germany, on May 10, 1933. Organized by Joseph Goebbels, books were burned in a celebratory fashion, complete with bands, marchers, and songs. Seeking to "cleanse" German culture of the "un-German" spirit, Goebbels compelled students (who were egged on by their professors) to perform the book burning. To some this could be easily dismissed as the childish actions of the youth, but to many in Europe and America, it was a horrific display of power and disrespect. During the denazification which followed the war, literature which had been confiscated by the Allies was reduced to pulp rather than burned.

In 1937, during Getúlio Vargas' dictatorship in Brazil, several books by authors such as Jorge Amado and José Lins do Rego were burned in an anti-communist act.

In the People's Republic of China from the 1940s to present day, library officials publicize the burning of "illegal publications, religious publications".

In 1942, local Catholic priests forced Irish storyteller Timothy Buckley to burn a book The Tailor and Ansty by Eric Cross about Buckley and his wife, because of its sexual frankness.

In the 1950s, over six tons of books by William Reich were burned in the U.S. in compliance with judicial orders. In 1954, the works of Mordecai Kaplan were burned by Orthodox Jewish rabbis in America, after Kaplan was excommunicated.

In Denmark, a comic book burning took place on 23 June 1955. It was a bonfire which consisted of comic books topped by a life-size cardboard cutout of The Phantom.

During the military dictatorship in Brazil from (1964-1985), several methods of censure were used, among them, torture and the burning of books by firemen.

Some supporters have celebrated book-burning cases in art and other media. Such is the case in Italy in 1973 with The Burning of Heretical Books over a side door on the façade of Santa Maria Maggiore, Rome, the bas-relief by Giovanni Battista Maini, which depicts the burning of "heretical" books as a triumph of righteousness.

During the years of the Chilean military dictatorship under Augusto Pinochet from 1973 to 1990, hundreds of books were burned as a way of repression and censorship of left-wing literature. In some instances, even books on Cubism were burned because soldiers thought it had to do with the Cuban Revolution.

In 1981, the Jaffna Public Library in Jaffna, Sri Lanka, was burned down by Sinhalese police and paramilitaries during a pogrom against the minority Tamil population. At the time of its burning, it contained almost 100,000 Tamil books and rare documents.

Kjell Ludvik Kvavik, a senior Norwegian official, had a penchant for removing maps and other pages from rare books and he was noticed in January 1983 by a young college student. The student, Barbro Andenaes, reported the actions of the senior official to the superintendent of the reading room and then reported them to the head librarian of the university library in Oslo. Hesitant to make the accusation against Kvavik public because it would greatly harm his career, even if it was proven to be false, the media did not divulge his name until his house was searched by police. The authorities seized 470 maps and prints as well as 112 books that Kvavik had illegally obtained. While this may not have been the large-scale, violent demonstration which usually occurs during wars, Kvavik's disregard for libraries and books shows that the destruction of books on any scale can affect an entire country. Here, a senior official in the Norwegian government was disgraced and the University Library was only refunded for a small portion of the costs which it had incurred from the loss and destruction of rare materials and the security changes that had to be made as a result of it. In this case, the lure of personal profit and the desire to enhance one's own collection were the causes of the defacement of rare books and maps. While the main goal was not destruction for destruction's sake, the resulting damage to the ephemera still carries weight within the library community.

In 1984, Amsterdam's South African Institute was infiltrated by an organized group which was bent on drawing attention to the inequality of apartheid. Well-organized and assuring patrons of the library that no harm would come to them, group members systematically smashed microfiche machines and threw books into the nearby waterway. Indiscriminate with regard to the content which was being destroyed, shelf after shelf was cleared of its contents until the group left. Staff members fished books from the water in hopes of salvaging the rare editions of travel books, documents about the Boer Wars, and contemporary materials which were both for and against apartheid. Many of these materials were destroyed by oil, ink, and paint that the anti-apartheid demonstrators had flung around the library. The world was outraged by the loss of knowledge that these demonstrators had caused, and instead of supporting their cause and drawing people's attention to the issue of apartheid, the international community denounced their actions at Amsterdam's South African Institute. Some of the demonstrators came forward and sought to justify their actions by accusing the institute of being pro-apartheid and claiming that nothing was being done to change the status quo in South Africa.

21st century
The advent of the digital age has resulted in the cataloguing of an immense collection of written works, exclusively or primarily in digital form. The intentional deletion or removal of these works has often been referred to as a new form of book burning. For example, Amazon, the world's largest online marketplace, has increasingly banned the sale of controversial books. An article in The New York Times reported that "Booksellers that sell on Amazon say the retailer has no coherent philosophy about what it decides to prohibit, and seems largely guided by public complaints.".

A biblioclastic incident occurred in Mullumbimby, New South Wales, Australia in 2009. Reported as "just like the ritual burning of books in Nazi Germany", a book-burning ceremony was held by students of the "socially harmful cult" Universal Medicine, an esoteric healing business which was owned by Serge Benhayon. Students were invited to throw their books onto the pyre. Most of the volumes were on Chinese medicine, kinesiology, acupuncture, homeopathy and other alternative healing modalities, all of which Benhayon has decreed evil or "prana".

Russian nationalists burned Ukrainian history books in Crimea in 2010. Prorussian demonstrators burned books in Eastern Ukraine, 2014.

After the failed 2016 Turkish coup d'état, the Turkish government burned 301,878 books deemed related to the coup or its alleged leader, Fethullah Gülen, including 18 textbooks with the word "Pennsylvania" in them. Photos of books being burned became a viral sensation on the internet once they were taken by a website named Kronos27.

In 2019, the French-language Providence Catholic School Board in southwestern Ontario held a 'flame purification' ceremony and burned around thirty recently banned children's books. The ashes were used as fertilizer to plant trees and according to the participants the action was 'to turn a negative to a positive'. The books included Tintin and Asterix and were deemed harmful to Indigenous people.

Since the introduction of the controversial national security law in 2020, multiple counts of biblioclasm have been reported. Shortly after the introduction of the new law, books written by prominent Hong Kong pro-democracy figures, including Joshua Wong and Tanya Chan, have been removed from public libraries. In 2021, 29 previously available titles about the Tiananmen Massacre are completely removed from the public libraries, whilst 94 of the remaining 120 titles are only available on request. In 2022, reported by local media, three secondary schools removed more than 400 books since June 2021. Unlike the two book burning happened in the public libraries, the schools were not given any concrete criteria but the schools had to perform the self-censorship themselves. Titles that were removed included those related to the 2019-2020 Hong Kong protests, Tiananmen Massacre and jailed activists. In the same year, the Hong Kong government also refused to provide a list of books that have been removed from the public libraries.

In February 2021 some religious communities in the United States have started holding book burning ceremonies to garner attention and publicly denounce heretical beliefs. In Tennessee pastor Greg Locke has held sermons over the incineration of books like Harry Potter and Twilight. This trend of calling for the burning of books one's ideology conflicts with has continued into the political sphere. Two members of a Virginia school board Rabih Abuismail, and Kirk Twigg, have condoned the burning of recently banned books to keep their ideas out of the minds of the public.

Sikh book burning
In the Sikh religion, any copies of their sacred book, Guru Granth Sahib, which are too badly damaged to be used, and any printer's waste which bears any of its text, are cremated. This ritual is called an Agan Bhet, and it is similar to the ritual which is performed when a deceased Sikh is cremated.

Book burnings in popular culture

 In chapters 6 and 7 of the first part of Don Quixote, his friends examine his library, full with chivalry romances and other books, and decide to burn most of them and seal the room. The comments of the priest allow author Cervantes to praise or condemn the books.
In his 1821 play, Almansor, the German writer Heinrich Heine – referring to the burning of the Muslim holy book, the Qur'an, during the Spanish Inquisition – wrote, "Where they burn books, so too will they in the end burn people." ("Dort, wo man Bücher verbrennt, verbrennt man auch am Ende Menschen.") Over a century later, Heine's own books were among the thousands of volumes that were torched by the Nazis in Berlin's Opernplatz, even while his poem "Die Lorelei" continued to be printed in German schoolbooks as "by an unknown author".
 Book burning played a small part in Jules Verne's 1864 Journey to the Center of the Earth. After Professor Lidenbrock deciphers a writing of Arne Saknussem and attempts to recreate his purported subterranean journey, his nephew Axel protests that they should study more of his works before making any rash decisions. Professor Lidenbrock explains that this is impossible: Saknussem was out of favor in his native country, whose leaders ordered all of his writings burned after his death.
 In Ray Bradbury's 1953 novel Fahrenheit 451, about a culture which has outlawed books due to its disdain for learning, books are burned along with the houses they are hidden in.

See also

 Banned books
 Library fires
 List of book-burning incidents
 Maya codices
 Bonfire of the vanities
 Bibliophobia

Further reading

 
 Civallero, Edgardo. When Memory Turns into Ashes... Memoricide During the XX Century . DOI.
 Knuth, Rebecca (2006). Burning Books and Leveling Libraries: Extremist violence and Cultural Destruction. Westport, Connecticut: Praeger.
 Knuth, Rebecca. Libricide : the regime-sponsored destruction of books and libraries in the twentieth century. 
 Ovenden, Richard Burning the Books. London: John Murray
 Polastron, Lucien X. 2007. Books on Fire: The Destruction of Libraries throughout History. Rochester, VT: Inner Traditions.
 The Bosnian Manuscript Ingathering Project – A call for Bosnian manuscripts ingathering
 Polastron, Lucien X. (2007) Libros en Llamas: historia de la interminable destrucción de bibliotecas. Libraria, .
 Polastron, Lucien X. Books on fire: the destruction of libraries throughout history. 
 Raven, James. (2004). Lost Libraries: The Destruction of Great Book Collections Since Antiquity. Palgrave Macmillan Limited.
 UNESCO. Lost Memory – Libraries and archives destroyed in the twentieth century
 Books on Fire: The Destruction of Libraries Throughout History. Lucien Xavier Polastron. Translated by John E Graham. Inner Traditions. . .

References

External links

 "On Book Burnings and Book Burners: Reflections on the Power (and Powerlessness) of Ideas" by Hans J. Hillerbrand
 "Burning books" by Haig A. Bosmajian
 "Bannings and burnings in history" – Book and Periodical Council (Canada)
 "The books have been burning: timeline" by Daniel Schwartz, CBC News. Updated 10 September 2010.

 
Events relating to freedom of expression
Book censorship
History of books
Historical negationism
Freedom of expression
Protest tactics
Anti-intellectualism